Cyanotech Corporation is a micro-algae producing company leasing land in the Natural Energy Lab of Hawaii on the Kona Coast of the island of Hawaii. The company produces BioAstin® Natural Astaxanthin and Hawaiian Spirulina Pacifica.

History
Cyanotech was co-founded in 1983 by Gerry Cysewski. The Bioastin brand was approved by the FDA as the first generally recognized as safe product containing Astaxanthin in 1999.

References

Companies listed on the Nasdaq
Dietary supplements